Ocean Colour Scene is the eponymous 1992 debut album by the British rock group Ocean Colour Scene.  It was released during the early Britpop era with far less critical interest than their highly successful second album Moseley Shoals.  Ocean Colour Scene themselves largely ignore this album, feeling that the band and label's conflicting musical views led to a 'watered-down' debut which lacked the edge of the band's live popularity.

The first single from the album was "Sway" in February 1992, followed by "Giving it All Away" in March and finally "Do Yourself a Favour" in May. A  remastered 2CD Deluxe edition of the album was released in February 2014 which included the original album together with A and B sides of early singles and a few outtakes.

Track listing 
All songs written by Ocean Colour Scene except as indicated.

 "Talk On" – 4:07
 "How About You" – 3:14
 "Giving It All Away" – 4:11
 "Justine" – 3:32
 "Do Yourself a Favour" (Stevie Wonder, Syreeta Wright) – 3:48
 "Third Shade of Green" – 4:39
 "Sway" – 3:42
 "Penny Pinching Rainy Heaven Days" – 3:13
 "One of Those Days" – 4:13
 "Is She Coming Home" – 6:06
 "Blue Deep Ocean" – 4:56
 "Reprise" – 1:30

2014 Deluxe Edition Bonus Disc 
 "One of Those Days" (Single Version) – 5:01
 "Talk On" – 4:33
 "Sway" (Original Version) – 3:55
 "Lullaby" – 1:49
 "One of These Days" – 5:37
 "Yesterday Today" – 3:18
 "Another Girl's Name" – 3:24
 "Fly Me" – 4:32
 "No One Says" – 5:01
 "My Brother Sarah" – 2:44
 "Mona Lisa Eyes" – 3:42
 "Bellechoux" – 3:23
 "Flowers" – 4:04
 "Don't Play" – 4:15
 "The Seventh Floor" – 5:05
 "Patsy in Green" – 2:24
 "Suspended Motion" – 3:55
 "Blue Deep Ocean" (Alt. Version) – 4:40
 "Is She Coming Home" (Alt. Version) – 6:07

References

External links

Ocean Colour Scene at YouTube (streamed copy where licensed)
 Ocean Colour Scene Album Details
 https://dipsar.org/

Ocean Colour Scene albums
1992 debut albums
Fontana Records albums